Loren L. Coleman is a science-fiction writer, born and grew up in Longview, Washington. He is known for having written many books for series such as Star Trek, Battletech/Mechwarrior, Age of Conan, Crimson Skies, Magic: The Gathering and others. He has also written game fiction and source material for such companies as FASA Corporation, TSR, Inc. and Wizards of the Coast. He resides in Washington with his wife Heather and three children.

Career
Loren L. Coleman is a former member of the United States Navy. He has written several novels for Battletech, including the last of FASA's novels for the "Classic" BattleTech era, Endgame (2002). Coleman also secured a license to publish original Battletech fiction set in that same era, which he was able sell using a subscription-based website; Randall N. Bills, the BattleTech line developer, was interested regarding Coleman's idea and how it could be used to start a new business.

He is also one of the founders of InMediaRes, a company that he started with Heather Coleman, Randall Bills, Tara Bills and Philip DeLuca in 2003 with the intention of licensing Classic BattleTech fiction. This was accomplished in the fall of 2003 when WizKids agreed to grant IMR an exclusive license for publishing new, canon BattleTech fiction online. This was done through BattleCorps.com, which was launched in August 2004.

In 2005, InMediaRes announced its intention to create a similar website for Shadowrun, Holostreets.

Coleman announced on April 20, 2007, that InMediaRes was in negotiations to acquire the licenses for Classic BattleTech and Shadowrun from WizKids as Fantasy Productions' license was set to expire.

In June 2007, InMediaRes created the Catalyst Game Labs imprint from which to publish their Shadowrun, and Classic BattleTech licensed properties, as well as other material which could be produced or licensed at a later date.

In early 2010s, he began writing The ICAS Files series, a science fiction short-stories.

Bibliography
1997. Double-Blind
1997. Binding Force
1999. Bloodlines
1999. Into the Maelstrom
1999. Threads of Ambition
1999. Killing Fields, The
2000. Illusions of Victory
2000. Rogue Flyer
2001. Falcon's Prey
2001. Flashpoint
2001. Patriots and Tyrants
2002. Storms of Fate
2002. Endgame
2003. By Temptations and By War
2003. Call to Arms, A
2004. Blood of the Isle
2005. Blood of Wolves
2005. Cimmerian Rage
2005. Fortress Republic
2005. Songs of Victory
2005. Sword of Sedition

Notes

External links
 Author's official website
Short bio and bibliography
Another bibliography
Battlecorps website 
Holostreets website
Catalyst Game Labs website

20th-century American male writers
20th-century American novelists
21st-century American male writers
21st-century American novelists
American male novelists
American science fiction writers
Dungeons & Dragons game designers
Living people
People from Longview, Washington
United States Navy sailors
Year of birth missing (living people)